Bandakpur is a small town in the district of Damoh in Madhya Pradesh, India. The town is known for a temple of Shiva -the Jageshwar Nath temple.

There is a main temple where Shiva-Linga is situated in main sanctum. Devi Parvati faces Shiva on an adjacent temple.

The Temple of lord Shiva situated at Bandakpur Dist- Damoh Madhya Pradesh Called Jageshwar Nath Temple. This is approx 500 years old temple. In front of lord Shiva there is a Same Temple of Goddess Parvati.

Doors of the temple opens early in the morning (5:30 am during summer and 6:00 am during winter) and closing time of the doors is (10:00 PM during summer and 9:00 PM during winter)

Other Temple Beside of lord Jageshwarnath

 Lord Krishna (Radha Krishna)
 Goddess Durga 
 Lord Kaal-Bhairav
 Lord Vishnu
 Goddess Lakshmi
 Goddess Narmada
 Lord Hanuman 
 Lord Ganesh

Every year, many Kanvaraiya (people who fetch water pot from Narmada river and keep this water pot on special bamboo baskets like balance structure) fetch Narmada-Jal by walking from Narmada and pour that holy water to lord Shiva.

Large Mela gathering happens every year on Basant Panchami and Shivratri. Crowd gathers on Somvati Amavasya also.

References

Damoh
Cities and towns in Damoh district